Thierry Libaert is a leading French specialist on Organizational Communication. He has been professor of Organizational Communication at the Université catholique de Louvain (Belgium) where he chaired the Laboratory for the Analysis of Organisational Communication Systems (LASCO).  He previously worked for the State industry department, for a public relations agency and as PR manager for one of France's leading companies.

He is also scientific collaborator to the earth & Life Institute and advisor to the European Economic and Social Committee. He is the author of around thirty books.

Bibliography

Books

 Des vents porteurs. Comment mobiliser (enfin) pour la planète. Ed Le Pommier. 2020. Lauréat du prix du livre Environnement 2021.
 Piloter votre communication (avec Jacques Suart). Dunod. 2019.
 Communication de crise (avec Bernard Motulsky, Nicolas Baygert, Nicolas Vanderbiest et Mathias Vicherat). Pearson. 2018.
 Déprogrammer l'obsolescence. Les Petits matins (maison d'édition). 2017.
 Les Nouvelles Luttes sociales et environnementales. (Avec Jean-Marie Pierlot). Vuibert. 2015.
 Communication(s). Dunod. 2013.

 Le Lobbying. (With Pierre Bardon). Dunod/Topos. 2012.
 Communication et Environnement, le pacte impossible. Presses Universitaires de France. 2010.
 Toute la fonction communication. (With Aude Riom & Assael Adary). Dunod. 2010.
 La communication corporate. (With Karine Johannes). Dunod. 2010.
 Contredire l'entreprise. (With Andrea Catellani & Jean Marie Pierlot). Presses de l'Université Louvain. 2010.
 Introduction à la communication. Dunod/Topos. 2009.
 Communicator. Toute la communication d'entreprise. (With Marie-Hélène Westphalen). Dunod. 2009.
 La communication des associations. (With Jean-Marie Pierlot). Dunod. 2009.
 La communication externe de l'entreprise. (With Marie Hélène Westphalen). Dunod Topos. 2008.
 Communiquer dans un monde incertain. Village mondial. 2008.
 Le développement durable. With André-Jean Guérin. Dunod. 2008
 La communication sensible au coeur des nouvelles évolutions de l'entreprise. PhD Thesis in communication at the Université catholique de Louvain. 2008
Environnement et Entreprises. Au-delà des discourse (With Dominique Bourg and Alain Grandjean, Preface of Nicolas Hulot), Village Mondial, 2006
Les tableaux de bord de la communication (With André de Marco), Dunod, 2006,
Communication : la nouvelle donne, Village Mondial, 2004
La Transparence en trompe-l’œil, - Descartes et Cie/ Charles Léopold Mayer, 2003
La Communication de Crise - Dunod Topos, 2001
Le Plan de Communication – Dunod, 2000
La Communication Interne (With Nicole d’Almeida) – Dunod Topos 1998
La Communication d’Entreprise - Economica – Gestion Poche, 1998
La Communication de Proximité – Communication locale, communication de terrain – Liaisons, 1996
La Communication Verte – L’écologie au service de l’entreprise – Liaisons, 1992.

References

External links 
Personal Website
European Economic and Social Committee Member page
LASCO Website

French academics
Academic staff of the Université catholique de Louvain
1959 births
Living people